Harmon G. Cropsey (August 16, 1917 – March 13, 2009) was an American politician and farmer.

Born in Volinia Township, Michigan, Cass County, Michigan, Cropsey served in the United States Navy during World War II. He went to Michigan State University and received his bachelor's degree from Iowa State University. He farmed in Iowa and Michigan and was the manager of the Iowa Canning Company in Vinton, Iowa. He served on the Geneva Public School Board and the Lewis Cass Intermediate School Board in Michigan. From 1981 to 1983, Cropsey served in the Michigan House of Representatives, as a Republican, and then served in the Michigan State Senate from 1983 to 1990. His son Alan Cropsey also served in the Michigan Legislature. He died in at his home in DeWitt, Michigan.

Notes

1917 births
2009 deaths
People from Vinton, Iowa
People from Cass County, Michigan
Military personnel from Michigan
Iowa State University alumni
Michigan State University alumni
Farmers from Iowa
Farmers from Michigan
School board members in Michigan
Republican Party members of the Michigan House of Representatives
Republican Party Michigan state senators
20th-century American politicians
People from DeWitt, Michigan
United States Navy personnel of World War II